Lawang Bato is a barangay in Valenzuela, Metro Manila, Philippines. The name "Lawang Bato" came from the once rocky land where the barangay once stood.

Demographics
Area: 287.50 . Population: 13237. Households: 3168.

Education
 Lawang Bato National High School. Founded in 1967. The current principal is MR.Eddie Alarte
 Lawang Bato Elementary School
 Charis Christian School of Val. Inc.
Saint Joseph School of Lawang Bato

References
 

Barangays of Metro Manila
Valenzuela, Metro Manila